The Harvard University sailing team is a varsity intercollegiate athletic team of Harvard University in Cambridge, Massachusetts, United States. The team is a member of the New England Intercollegiate Sailing Association, which is part of the Inter-Collegiate Sailing Association.

National championships 
Harvard has won 22 national championships:
5 Dinghy National Championships (1952, 1953, 1959, 1974 and 2003)
5 Women’s Dinghy National Championships (1968, 1969, 1970 and 1972 as Radcliffe College; and 2005)
4 Team Racing National Championships (1970 and 1974 with the NEISA team; 2002 and 2003)
3 Men's Singlehanded National Championships (Robert E. Doyle in 1970, Vincent Porter in 2004 and Henry Marshall in 2019) 
3 Women’s Singlehanded National Championships (Margaret Gill in 1999 and 2001, Sophia Montgomery in 2023)
2 Sloop National Championships (2001 and 2002)

And received the Leonard M. Fowle Trophy in 2001, 2002, 2003, 2004 and 2005.

Sailors 
ICSA College Sailor of the Year:
Sean Wagstad Doyle in 2002
Clayton Peter Bischoff in 2003
Ewell Cardwell Potts IV in 2004
ICSA Women's College Sailor of the Year:
Genny Tulloch in 2004

Fleet 
The fleet of the team's dinghies include 18 420s, 18 Flying Juniors (FJs), and 4 Lasers.

Venue 
The home venue of the team is the Harvard Sailing Center, previously named the Harvard University Yacht Club.

References

External links
Website

Inter-Collegiate Sailing Association teams
Harvard Crimson sailing